Tich Gwilym (10 September 1950 – 19 June 2005), born Robert Gwilliam, was a Welsh rock guitarist who was most notable for his Hendrix inspired version of the Welsh national anthem, Hen Wlad Fy Nhadau, considered one of the most famous renditions of the song.

Musical career
Tich was born in Llwynypia, in the Rhondda Valley on 10 September 1950. One of Tich's earliest bands was Kimla Taz, who he played with during the late 1960s. Although the band never gained any mainstream success, they were popular in South Wales and in 1969 played at the Croeso '69 Blues Festival at Abergavenny, alongside the likes of Fleetwood Mac and Jethro Tull.

Tich found fame in the 1970s, when as part of Geraint Jarman a'r Cynganeddwyr, he recorded the Welsh national anthem on the electric guitar. The Jimi Hendrix inspired version, which first appeared on Jarman's 1978 album also called Hen Wlad Fy Nhadau, became synonymous with Tich and has appeared on compilation albums of Welsh artists. In 2006, an eight track recording of the Welsh national anthem was 'discovered' in London. At the time it was alleged that this was a lost version by Hendrix, though others claimed that it was a rendition by Tich. When approached, ex-band member Geraint Jarman dismissed both claims, stating that 'It's definitely not Tich because his style was more like Hendrix's than the actual tape'. It was later discovered that the version was a hoax, perpetrated by record producer Martin Davies and ex-guitarist of The Vibrators, John Ellis.

In 1989, Tich formed three-piece band the Superclarks with Burke Shelley of Welsh band Budgie. Burke - later replaced by Peter Morgan - was bass player and lead vocalist. The band lasted until 1993 when Morgan moved to the USA. In the 1990s Tich also played alongside Welsh folk singer Siân James, joining her on a tour of Japan in 1998.

Death
In 2005, Tich was staying in a house in Canton in Cardiff. A fire broke out, after an unattended candle lit by the owner accidentally set clothes alight. Tich became trapped in the attic and was overcome by thick smoke and poisonous gases. An inquest into the fire in 2006 recorded a verdict of accidental death. A memorial concert was held for Tich at the Coal Exchange in Cardiff, and featured Welsh acts such as Man and Racing Cars.

Notes

1950 births
2005 deaths
Welsh rock guitarists
People from Llwynypia
Deaths by smoke inhalation
20th-century British guitarists
Deaths from fire
Accidental deaths in Wales